Ma Tianyu (born 12 July 1986), also known as Ray Ma, is a Chinese Mandopop singer and actor of Hui ethnicity. He graduated from the Beijing Film Academy.

Career

2006–2008: Debut as a singer
In 2006, Ma Tianyu entered the My Hero competition. He was the regional champion for the province of Wuhan and came sixth in the final round, and was chosen as the most popular contestant.

In 2007, Ma released his first album Beautiful Light. The album was well-received, and topped the Asia Music Chart for Chinese albums. Ma won two newcomer awards at the China Billboard Award Ceremony, and Most Popular Singer awards at the 5th Southeast Music Chart Awards and 11th Tencent Star Award Ceremony. The title song of the album, "The Death of Gentleness" was also chosen as the Top Ten Songs of the Year.

2009–2013: Acting debut and breakthrough
Ma made his acting debut in the film Evening of Roses, based on a novel of the same name by Cai Zhiheng. In 2010, he played the character Jia Baoyu in the historical television series The Legend of Daiyu.

Ma first gained public attention in 2011 when he starred in wuxia drama The Vigilantes in Masks alongside Wallace Huo and Cecilia Liu. He won the Breakthrough Actor award at the 2011 Youku Television Index Awards. He then starred in Hunan TV's family drama Treasure Mother Treasure Girl (2012), which topped viewership ratings. The same year, he had a guest starring role in Xuan-Yuan Sword: Scar of Sky, which was well received by the audience.

In 2013, Ma starred in the comedy film, The Cosplayers, and was chosen as the Most Promising Film Actor for his performance.

2014–present: Rising popularity
Ma gained an increase in popularity after starring in the wuxia drama Young Sherlock (2014). His portrayal of the elegant and dandy Wang Yuanfang was praised. He continued his success streak with dual roles in Swords of Legends (2014), which was a huge commercial success. The same year he released a single titled "Narcissus". The song received positive reviews from both the media and fans and topped various music charts in China.

In 2015, Ma joined the cast of travel-reality show Sisters Over Flowers, and sung the theme song titled "Let Time Rewind in the Wind" for the show. The same year, he starred in the comedy film Surprise. The film broke a million admissions and Ma received acclaim for his dynamic portrayal of a "tragic hero". Ma received the "Outstanding Male Artist" award at the Esquire Man at His Best Award.

In 2016, Ma starred in the epic fantasy drama Ice Fantasy, based on Guo Jingming's best-selling novel City of Fantasy, playing the role of the silent and mysterious ice prince, Ying Kongshi. He became known to wider international audience following the airing of the drama. The same year, he released the album Flower in Hand to celebrate his 10th anniversary since debut.

In 2017, Ma ranked 95th on Forbes China Celebrity 100 list.

In 2018, Ma starred in the crime action film A Better Tomorrow 2018 by Ding Sheng. The same year, he starred in the television series historical drama Secret of the Three Kingdoms, playing Liu Xie; and romance melodrama All Out of Love.

In 2019, Ma starred in romance melodrama River Flows To You alongside Zheng Shuang, and romance environmental drama My Mowgli Boy alongside actress Yang Zi.

Personal life 
Ma Tianyu was born in Wucheng County, Dezhou City, Shandong Province. His mother committed suicide on the night of Mid-Autumn Festival when he was 5 years old. His father also left because of debts. He and his two sisters lived with their elderly grandparents. In order to make a living, he took on the burden of supporting his family, Bei Piao, and went to work, when he was less than 16 years old. He met a group of "people closer to this circle" when he was a waiter at a bar, and they told Ma Tianyu that he should be an actor and take the Beijing Film Academy. At that time he had not found his proper career direction yet, so he accepted this suggestion from a friend. But because he was extremely timid, he least liked the atmosphere of the exam. In order to practice courage, he signed up for "Come on! Good man".

Discography

Albums

Singles

Soundtracks and promotional songs

Other appearances

Filmography

Film

Television series

Variety show

Awards and nominations

References

External links 
 
  Ma Tianyu's Weibo

1986 births
Living people
Chinese Mandopop singers
Hui male actors
Hui singers
Male actors from Shandong
People from Dezhou
Musicians from Shandong
Singers from Shandong
Chinese male television actors
Chinese male film actors
21st-century Chinese male actors
Beijing Film Academy alumni
21st-century Chinese male singers